Flatirons Rush Soccer Club is a professional soccer club based in Arvada, Colorado, that competes in the Mountain Division of USL League Two.

History
The club history dates back to 1997, when Club Columbine and Lakewood United Soccer Club announced that they were merging. They are owned by Rush Sports, who also back three other USL2 sides – Cedar Stars Rush, Daytona Rush SC, Virginia Beach United.

The club was set to join USL League Two for the 2020 season, however, the season was canceled due to the COVID-19 pandemic. They will serve as the only Colorado-based team in the league, filling the gap left when the Colorado Rapids U-23 departed the league, following the 2018 PDL season.

Year-by-year

References

USL League Two teams
Soccer clubs in Colorado
Association football clubs established in 1997
1997 establishments in Colorado
Sports teams in Denver